There are several Legal practitioners across the six geopolitical zones of Nigeria.

This is a list of notable jurists in Nigeria, arranged in alphabetical order.

A
FOM Atake
Aloma Mariam Mukhtar
Ayotunde Phillips
Ade Ipaye
Atedze William Agwaza

B
Bamidele Aturu

C

D
Dahiru Musdapher
Damilola Sunday Olawuyi
Danladi Umar

E

F
Festus Keyamo
Folagbade Olateru Olagbegi

G

H

I
Idowu Sofola

J
Joseph Bodurin Daudu
John Taylor
Joseph Adefarasin

K
Kehinde Sofola

L
Lateef Olufemi Okunnu

M

N
Nnaemeka David Ezeugwu

O
Okey Wali
Oluwafunmilayo Olajumoke Atilade
Olaoluwa Abagun
Olumide Akpata
Oboagwina Caleb

P

 Paul Usoro

Q

R

S

T

U

V

W
Wole Olanipekun

X

Y
Yemi Osinbajo
Yemi Akinseye George

Z

References

Jurists
Lists of legal professionals